Over Wyresdale is a civil parish in Lancaster, Lancashire, England. It contains 53 buildings that are recorded in the National Heritage List for England as designated listed buildings.  Of these, one is at Grade II*, the middle grade, and the others are at Grade II, the lowest grade.

The parish is mainly rural, containing several small settlements, including Abbeystead.  Most of the listed buildings are houses and associated structures, farmhouses and farm buildings.  The largest house in the parish is Abbeystead House; this and associated structures are listed.  The other listed buildings include a former mill, a church, milestones, bridges, a school, a pound, a boundary stone, and a telephone kiosk.

Key

Buildings

References

Citations

Sources

Lists of listed buildings in Lancashire
Buildings and structures in the City of Lancaster